The Soltam K6 is a 120 mm (4.75 inch) mortar that was developed by Soltam Systems of Israel. It is the long-range version of the Soltam K5 and has replaced older systems, such as the  M30, in several armies including the United States Army. It is much lighter than the M30, has a greater range, and can sustain a rate of fire of four rounds per minute, while the M30 could sustain only three.

Design overview 
The K6 fires fin-stabilized ammunition from a smoothbore barrel. Unlike its smaller ammunition cousins, the 81 mm and 60 mm mortars, the fin blades of the ammunition fired from the M120 are not canted. Thus, no spin is imparted to the projectile in flight. Although heavy mortars require trucks or tracked mortar carriers to move them, they are still much lighter than field artillery pieces. They outrange light and medium mortars, and their explosive power is much greater. An improved version is known as the K6A3.

History and deployment 

The K6 entered service with the United States Army in 1991 as the M120 Mortar System. Its mission is to provide heavy weapon, high-angle organic indirect fire support to the unit commander. The M120 is used by both mechanized units and light infantry in certain situations. Another feature of the M120 is the M303 Sub-Caliber insert, which allows the mortar to fire 81 mm ammunition.

The M120 is transported on the M1100 Trailer by the M998 Humvee. The version that is mounted on the M1064 and M1129 mortar carriers is known as the M121.

In 2007, the U.S. Army ordered 588 M326 MSS (Mortar Stowage Systems) from BAE Systems. Here, the assembled mortar is mounted on a truck, Humvee or M1101 trailer and can be mounted and dismounted in less than 20 seconds.

In November 2016, Elbit Systems announced it was awarded an Indefinite Delivery/Indefinite Quantity (ID/IQ) contract for the production of the M121

Components 

The M120 mortar system consists of the following major components:
 M298 cannon assembly
 M190 bipod assembly
 M9 baseplate
 M1100 trailer
 M67 sight unit

The M120 is capable of firing the following munitions:
 XM395 precision guided munition
 M929 smoke cartridge (White Phosphorus)
 XM930 illumination round
 XM930E1 illumination round
 XM931 practice round
 M933 high explosive round
 M934 high explosive round
 M934A1 high explosive round
 XM983 illumination round

Operators

: 12; M120 variant
: M120 variant
: 20
: 18
: 450; M120 variant

 M120 variant
: 25; M120 variant
:80
: 142; M120 variant
: 1,076 M120 and M1064A3 variants

See also 
 120 Krh/40 – The Finnish weapon that served as the basis for Soltam M-65 and K6
 Cardom 120 mm recoil mortar system
 M1064 mortar carrier – M113 series vehicle fitted with M121 120 mm mortar
 M1129 Mortar Carrier – Stryker series vehicle fitted with M121 120 mm mortar
 Soltam M-65 120 mm mortar
 M327 – 120 mm towed mortar used the USMC
 List of U.S. military vehicles by model number

References

External links

 Pocket artillery
 M120 120mm Mortar
 M120 Field Manual
 de:M120 (Mörser)

Mortars of the United States
Mortars of Israel
Infantry mortars
120mm mortars
Military equipment introduced in the 1990s